Special One is the fourteenth studio album by the band Cheap Trick. It was released in 2003 to mixed reviews and features the single "Scent of a Woman." It charted for one week, reaching 128 on the album charts.

Background
Special One was the first studio album by Cheap Trick in six years. Eleven weeks after the release of their previous studio album Cheap Trick in 1997, the parent company of their record label, Red Ant Records, went bankrupt and it ended the promotion of the album. They formed their own record label, Cheap Trick Unlimited, which released several live albums. In 2001, they started writing songs which they eventually recorded in eight different studios for the 2003 release of Special One. Unlike most of their albums from the late 80s through the mid 90s, this album contained all self-penned material with minor contributions from outside writers. The album was not well received and generally got less than favorable reviews in the music press. Stephen Thomas Erlewine of AllMusic writes "Special One is never embarrassing, the way that some of the group's late-'80s efforts are to their core audience, but it never delivers the goods, either, and it's hard to hear the group strain to reach the idealized heights that their fans believe they once reached effortlessly."

Track listing

Singles
All singles were released as promotional singles only to radio stations.

 (2003) "Scent of a Woman"
 (2003) "My Obsession"
 (2003) "Too Much"

Bonus DVD
A limited edition of the album was available upon release and included five music videos.
 
 "Say Goodbye" (from Cheap Trick (1997 album))
 "Hot Love" (from the Music for Hangovers DVD)
 "Hard to Tell" (from the Silver DVD)
 "Woke Up with a Monster" (from Woke Up With a Monster)
 "He's a Whore" (from Cheap Trick (1977 album))

Personnel

Cheap Trick
 Robin Zander – lead vocals, rhythm guitar
 Rick Nielsen – lead guitar, backing vocals
 Tom Petersson – bass, backing vocals
 Bun E. Carlos – drums

Technical
 Chris Shaw – producer, engineer
 Eric Tew – engineer
 Howie Weinberg – mastering
 Kii Arens – design

Charts

References

Cheap Trick albums
2003 albums